Škofljica is a settlement in central Slovenia. It is the seat of the Municipality of Škofljica. It lies on the eastern edge of the marshlands south of the capital Ljubljana. The entire municipality is part of the traditional region of Lower Carniola and is now included in the Central Slovenia Statistical Region.

Church
The parish church in the settlement is dedicated to Saints Cyril and Methodius and belongs to the Roman Catholic Archdiocese of Ljubljana. It is a modern building built in 1986.

References

External links

Škofljica on Geopedia

Populated places in the Municipality of Škofljica